Thomas James Kearney (born 7 October 1981 in Liverpool) is a retired professional footballer who last played for Altrincham in the Conference National.

Halifax signed Tom Kearney in September 2006. He has played at Everton and Bradford City. In June 2008, he joined Conference National side Wrexham. He joined Conference National side Altrincham on 21 July 2009 after being released by Wrexham.

He retired from football after suffering a broken leg in a match against his former club Wrexham.

His sister is actress Gillian Kearney.

Following his retirement from football, he returned to Everton as an academy coach.

References

External links

1981 births
Living people
English footballers
Everton F.C. players
Bradford City A.F.C. players
Halifax Town A.F.C. players
Wrexham A.F.C. players
Altrincham F.C. players
English Football League players
National League (English football) players
Footballers from Liverpool
Association football midfielders